Sir Herbert Walter Butcher, 1st Baronet (12 June 1901 – 11 May 1966) was an English Conservative and National Liberal politician. He sat in the House of Commons from 1937 to 1966.

Butcher was the son of Frank Butcher.  He was educated at Hastings Grammar School, and served in the Royal Navy during World War I, from 1916 to 1919. He was as a Hackney Borough Councillor from 1928 to 1961, serving as Mayor of Hackney from 1935 to 1937.

He was elected as the Member of Parliament (MP) for Holland with Boston at a by-election in June 1937, after the death of the National Liberal MP Sir James Blindell. He held the seat at the next six general elections until his retirement at the 1966 general election, when Richard Body was elected as his successor.

From 1950 to 1951, Butcher was Parliamentary Private Secretary (PPS) to the Civil Lord of the Admiralty, Walter "Stoker" Edwards.  He served as a Lord of the Treasury from 1951 to 1953. In 1958, he advised his friend John Poulson to set up a servicing company to win business for his architect's practice.

Having been knighted on 10 February 1953, Butcher was created a Baronet of Holland in the County of Lincoln on 22 July 1960.

After 29 years as an MP, Butcher died less than two months after his retirement, aged 64.

References

External links
 

1901 births
1966 deaths
Conservative Party (UK) MPs for English constituencies
UK MPs 1935–1945
UK MPs 1945–1950
UK MPs 1950–1951
UK MPs 1951–1955
UK MPs 1955–1959
UK MPs 1959–1964
UK MPs 1964–1966
Knights Bachelor
Baronets in the Baronetage of the United Kingdom
Place of birth missing
Place of death missing
People educated at Hastings Grammar School
Ministers in the third Churchill government, 1951–1955